Gurgulyat Peak is the peak rising to 1050 m in Kondofrey Heights on Trinity Peninsula, Antarctic Peninsula.  Situated 2.08 km southwest of Skakavitsa Peak, 4 km west by north of Mount Reece and 10.6 km south of Mount Schuyler.  Surmounting Victory Glacier to the north.

The peak is named after the settlement of Gurgulyat in western Bulgaria.

Location
German-British mapping in 1996.

Maps
 Trinity Peninsula. Scale 1:250000 topographic map No. 5697. Institut für Angewandte Geodäsie and British Antarctic Survey, 1996.
Antarctic Digital Database (ADD). Scale 1:250000 topographic map of Antarctica. Scientific Committee on Antarctic Research (SCAR). Since 1993, regularly upgraded and updated.

References
 Bulgarian Antarctic Gazetteer. Antarctic Place-names Commission. (details in Bulgarian, basic data in English)
 Gurgulyat Peak. SCAR Composite Antarctic Gazetteer

External links
 Gurgulyat Peak. Copernix satellite image

Mountains of Trinity Peninsula
Bulgaria and the Antarctic